The Folded Palm is the third album by Frog Eyes, released on September 14, 2004, on Absolutely Kosher Records.

Track listing 
 "The Fence Feels its Post" - 1:39
 "The Akhian Press" - 1:42
 "I Like Dot Dot Dot" - 1:10
 "Bells in the Crooked Port" - 2:27
 "New Soft Motherhood Alliance" - 3:01
 "Ship Destroyer" - 1:19
 "The Heart That Felt Its Light" - 2:28
 "The Oscillator's Hum" - 2:28
 "Important Signals Will Break the Darkness (this I hope)" - 2:28
 "New Tappy is Heard and Beheld" - 3:22
 "Ice on the Trail" - 5:42
 "A Library Used to Be (black hole and its concentrated edges)" - 2:19
 "Russian Berries but You're Quiet Tonight" - 3:54

References 

2004 albums
Frog Eyes albums
Absolutely Kosher Records albums